Kovyrtsevo is a rural locality (a village) in Baydarovskoye Rural Settlement, Nikolsky District, Vologda Oblast, Russia. The population was 23 as of 2002.

Geography 
Kovyrtsevo is located 15 km northeast of Nikolsk (the district's administrative centre) by road. Travino is the nearest rural locality.

References 

Rural localities in Nikolsky District, Vologda Oblast